Raigastvere is a lake in Estonia.

See also
List of lakes in Estonia

Raigastvere
Tartu Parish
Raigastvere